FC Sibir Novosibirsk was a Russian association football club based in Novosibirsk, playing at the Spartak Stadium. They played their first-ever season in the Russian Premier League in 2010, and ended with relegation to the Russian First Division.

History
The club was founded in 1936 and has been known as:
Krylya Sovetov (Soviet Wings) in 1936–1956
Sibselmash (Siberian Agricultural Machinery) in 1957–1965
SETM (Siberian Electrical Heavy Engineering) in 1969–1970
Dzerzhinets (after Felix Dzerzhinsky) in 1971
Chkalovets (after Valery Chkalov) in 1972–1991 and 1993–1999
Chkalovets-FoKuMiS in 1992
Chkalovets-1936 in 2000–2005
Sibir (Siberia) 2006–2019

The team played in the Soviet leagues in 1937 (Group E), 1946–1947 (Third Group and Second Group), in 1957–1962 (Class B), 1963–1968 (Class A), 1969–1984 (Class B and Second League), and in 1987–1991 (Second League and Second League B).

In 1992 Chkalovets entered the newly formed Russian First League and in 1994 was moved to the Russian Second League after the reduction of the First League. In 1994 Chkalovets were promoted to the First League, where they played in 1995 and 1996. In 1996 Chkalovets finished last among 22 teams and were relegated to the Second League.

In 2000 Chkalovets merged with Olimpik Novosibirsk, keeping their place in the Second League, and the team named Chkalovets-1936 entered the amateur league (KFK). According to Sibir  and independent sources , it is Chkalovets-1936 that inherits the history of the Soviet club.

Chkalovets-1936 were promoted to the Second League after the 2000 season, and in 2004 they won promotion to the First Division. They changed their name as Sibir in 2006 and promoted to Russian Premier League once after finishing First League as 2nd in 2009.

On 16 May 2010, Sibir lost in the Russian Cup 2009–10 final against Zenit 0–1, but as Zenit qualified for the Champions League, Sibir gained the right to compete in the Europa League in 2010–11, for the first time in their history, making them the easternmost team to compete in a European competition.

On 19 August 2010, Sibir unexpectedly beat PSV Eindhoven in a home game of Europa League play-off round, 1–0, with a goal in stoppage time. However, the team was eliminated a week later following a 0–5 defeat in Eindhoven.

At the end of the 2018–19 season, the club was relegated to the third-tier Russian Professional Football League. Following the relegation, the club did not apply for the professional license and another club called FC Novosibirsk was organized to represent the city.

Club honours
 Russian Cup: Runner-up 2009/2010
 2010–11 UEFA Europa League play-off round

League history

Russia
{|class="wikitable"
|-bgcolor="#efefef"
! Season
! Div.
! Pos.
! Pl.
! W
! D
! L
! GS
! GA
! P
!Cup
!colspan=2|Europe
!Top Scorer (League)
!Head Coach
|-
|align=center|1992
|align=center|2nd, "East"
|align=center|4
|align=center|30
|align=center|15
|align=center|6
|align=center|9
|align=center|48
|align=center|38
|align=center|36
|align=center|
|align=center|
|align=center|
|align=left| Kovalyov – 11
|align=left| Yerkovich
|-
|align=center|1993
|align=center|2nd, "East"
|align=center bgcolor=pink|14
|align=center|30
|align=center|8
|align=center|7
|align=center|15
|align=center|39
|align=center|43
|align=center|23
|align=center|R256
|align=center|
|align=center|
|align=left| Nikulin – 9
|align=left| Yerkovich
|-
|align=center|1994
|align=center|3rd, "Siberia"
|align=center bgcolor=lightgreen|1
|align=center|22
|align=center|16
|align=center|3
|align=center|3
|align=center|51
|align=center|12
|align=center|35
|align=center|R256
|align=center|
|align=center|
|align=left| Nikulin – 12
|align=left| Shevchenko
|-
|align=center|1995
|align=center|2nd
|align=center|11
|align=center|42
|align=center|19
|align=center|4
|align=center|19
|align=center|58
|align=center|65
|align=center|61
|align=center|R32
|align=center|
|align=center|
|align=left| Galkin – 14
|align=left| Shevchenko
|-
|align=center|1996
|align=center|2nd
|align=center bgcolor="pink"|22
|align=center|42
|align=center|7
|align=center|6
|align=center|29
|align=center|44
|align=center|102
|align=center|27
|align=center|R64
|align=center|
|align=center|
|align=left| Pimenov – 10
|align=left| Shevchenko /   Zaburdaev
|-
|align=center|1997
|align=center|3rd, "East"
|align=center|6
|align=center|34
|align=center|16
|align=center|8
|align=center|10
|align=center|46
|align=center|32
|align=center|56
|align=center|R64
|align=center|
|align=center|
|align=left| Obgolts – 9
|align=left| Yerkovich
|-
|align=center|1998
|align=center|3rd, "East"
|align=center|2
|align=center|30
|align=center|16
|align=center|12
|align=center|2
|align=center|41
|align=center|17
|align=center|60
|align=center|R512
|align=center|
|align=center|
|align=left| Nikulin – 9
|align=left| Iromashvili
|-
|align=center|1999
|align=center|3rd, "East"
|align=center bgcolor="pink"|5
|align=center|30
|align=center|16
|align=center|6
|align=center|8
|align=center|60
|align=center|42
|align=center|54
|align=center|R32
|align=center|
|align=center|
|align=left| Lidrik – 17
|align=left| Iromashvili
|-
|align=center|2000
|align=center|LFL(4th), "Siberia"
|align=center bgcolor="lightgreen"|1
|align=center|16
|align=center|15
|align=center|1
|align=center|0
|align=center|65
|align=center|6
|align=center|46
|align=center|R1024
|align=center|
|align=center|
|align=left|
|align=left| Iromashvili
|-
|align=center|2001
|align=center|3rd, "East"
|align=center|5
|align=center|28
|align=center|12
|align=center|11
|align=center|5
|align=center|36
|align=center|21
|align=center|47
|align=center|
|align=center|
|align=center|
|align=left| Lidrik – 11
|align=left| Iromashvili
|-
|align=center|2002
|align=center|3rd, "East"
|align=center|2
|align=center|30
|align=center|19
|align=center|6
|align=center|5
|align=center|61
|align=center|28
|align=center|63
|align=center|R256
|align=center|
|align=center|
|align=left| Ragoza – 17
|align=left| Iromashvili /  Yerkovich
|-
|align=center|2003
|align=center|3rd, "East"
|align=center|6
|align=center|24
|align=center|11
|align=center|7
|align=center|6
|align=center|38
|align=center|27
|align=center|40
|align=center|R32
|align=center|
|align=center|
|align=left| Shtyn – 8
|align=left| Yerkovich /  Shmarov
|-
|align=center|2004
|align=center|3rd, "East"
|align=center bgcolor="lightgreen"|1
|align=center|27
|align=center|19
|align=center|5
|align=center|3
|align=center|53
|align=center|19
|align=center|62
|align=center|R256
|align=center|
|align=center|
|align=left| Akimov – 24
|align=left| Puzanov
|-
|align=center|2005
|align=center|2nd
|align=center|10
|align=center|42
|align=center|15
|align=center|11
|align=center|16
|align=center|51
|align=center|53
|align=center|56
|align=center|R512
|align=center|
|align=center|
|align=left| Akimov – 18
|align=left| Puzanov /  Davydov
|-
|align=center|2006
|align=center|2nd
|align=center|7
|align=center|42
|align=center|19
|align=center|8
|align=center|15
|align=center|67
|align=center|45
|align=center|65
|align=center|R64
|align=center|
|align=center|
|align=left| Akimov – 23
|align=left| Davydov /  Radyukin
|-
|align=center|2007
|align=center|2nd
|align=center|3
|align=center|42
|align=center|25
|align=center|11
|align=center|6
|align=center|80
|align=center|39
|align=center|86
|align=center|R16
|align=center|
|align=center|
|align=left| Akimov – 34
|align=left| Fayzulin
|-
|align=center|2008
|align=center|2nd
|align=center|14
|align=center|42
|align=center|14
|align=center|16
|align=center|12
|align=center|51
|align=center|41
|align=center|58
|align=center|R4
|align=center|
|align=center|
|align=left| Akimov – 12
|align=left| Oborin
|-
|align=center|2009
|align=center|2nd
|align=center bgcolor="lightgreen"|2
|align=center|38
|align=center|22
|align=center|7
|align=center|9
|align=center|60
|align=center|21
|align=center|73
|align=center|F
|align=center|
|align=center|
|align=left| Medvedev – 18
|align=left| Kriushenko
|-
|align=center|2010
|align=center|1st
|align=center bgcolor=pink|16
|align=center|30
|align=center|4
|align=center|8
|align=center|18
|align=center|34
|align=center|58
|align=center|20
|align=center|R8
|align=center|EU
|align=center|PO
|align=left| Medvedev – 6
|align=left| Kriushenko
|-
|align=center|2011–12
|align=center|2nd
|align=center|7
|align=center|52
|align=center|19
|align=center|19
|align=center|14
|align=center|76
|align=center|57
|align=center|76
|align=center|R32
|align=center|
|align=center|
|align=left|Akimov – 20
|align=left| Kriushenko /  Radyukin /
 Miller /  Kubicki
|-
|align=center|2012–13
|align=center|2nd
|align=center|8
|align=center|32
|align=center|12
|align=center|9
|align=center|11
|align=center|34
|align=center|38
|align=center|45
|align=center|R32
|align=center|
|align=center|
|align=left|Medvedev – 6
|align=left| Yuran /   Kubicki
|-
|align=center|2013–14
|align=center|2nd
|align=center|11
|align=center|36
|align=center|13
|align=center|12
|align=center|11
|align=center|38
|align=center|39
|align=center|51
|align=center|R32
|align=center|
|align=center|
|align=left|Markosov – 5
|align=left| Kubicki /   Balakhnin
|-
|align=center|2014–15
|align=center|2nd
|align=center|11
|align=center|34
|align=center|11
|align=center|9
|align=center|14
|align=center|35
|align=center|46
|align=center|42
|align=center|R16
|align=center|
|align=center|
|align=left|Svezhov – 7
|align=left| Balakhnin /   Gordeyev
|-
|align=center|2015–16
|align=center|2nd
|align=center|11
|align=center|38
|align=center|14
|align=center|9
|align=center|15
|align=center|47
|align=center|50
|align=center|51
|align=center|R32
|align=center|
|align=center|
|align=left|Zhitnev – 16
|align=left| Stukalov
|-
|align=center|2016–17
|align=center|2nd
|align=center|15
|align=center|38
|align=center|9
|align=center|15
|align=center|14
|align=center|31
|align=center|46
|align=center|42
|align=center|R4
|align=center|
|align=center|
|align=left|Cebotaru – 9
|align=left| Perevertailo /   Kirsanov
|-
|align=center|2017–18
|align=center|2nd
|align=center|7
|align=center|38
|align=center|14
|align=center|11
|align=center|13
|align=center|38
|align=center|31
|align=center|53
|align=center| R32
|align=center|
|align=center|
|align=left|
|align=left|
|-
|align=center|2018–19
|align=center|2nd
|align=center bgcolor=pink|18
|align=center|38
|align=center|8
|align=center|13
|align=center|17
|align=center|28
|align=center|45
|align=center|37
|align=center| R32
|align=center|
|align=center|
|align=left|
|align=left|

|}

European campaigns

Reserve squad
FC Sibir reserve team, FC Sibir-2 Novosibirsk, played in Russian Second Division (East Zone) in 2008, and then once again from 2011 until 2015–16, and yet again from the 2018–19 season.

References

External links
Official website 

 
Defunct football clubs in Russia
Association football clubs established in 1936
Association football clubs disestablished in 2019
Sport in Novosibirsk
1936 establishments in Russia
2019 disestablishments in Russia